Dwayne Michael Carter Jr. (born September 27, 1982), known professionally as Lil Wayne, is an American rapper. His career began in 1995, at the age of 12, when he was signed by rapper Birdman, joining Cash Money Records as the youngest member of the label. From then on, Wayne was the flagship artist of Cash Money Records before ending his association with the company in June 2018. Regarded as one of the most influential hip hop artists of his generation by XXL, he has often been cited as one of the greatest rappers of all time.

In 1995, Wayne was put in a duo with label-mate B.G. (at the time known as Lil Doogie) and they recorded an album, True Story, released that year, although Wayne (at the time known as Baby D) only appeared on three tracks. Wayne and B.G. soon joined the southern hip hop group Hot Boys, with Cash Money label-mates Juvenile and Turk in 1997; they released their debut album Get It How U Live! in October that year. The Hot Boys became popular following the release of the album Guerrilla Warfare (1999) and the song "Bling Bling".

Lil Wayne's solo debut album Tha Block Is Hot (1999) was his solo breakthrough, and he reached higher popularity with his fourth album Tha Carter (2004) and fifth album Tha Carter II (2005), as well as several mixtapes and collaborations throughout 2006 and 2007. He gained more prominence within the music industry with his sixth album Tha Carter III (2008), with first-week sales of over one million copies in the US. The album won the Grammy Award for Best Rap Album and included successful singles "A Milli", "Got Money" (featuring T-Pain), and "Lollipop" (featuring Static Major)—the latter being his first single to reach number one on the Billboard Hot 100.

In February 2010, Wayne released his seventh studio album, Rebirth, which experimented with rap rock and was met with generally negative reviews. A month later in March 2010, Lil Wayne began serving an 8-month jail sentence in New York after being convicted of criminal possession of a weapon stemming from an incident in July 2007. His eighth studio album I Am Not a Human Being (2010) was released during his incarceration, while his 2011 album Tha Carter IV was released following his release. Tha Carter IV sold 964,000 copies in its first week in the United States. His twelfth studio album Tha Carter V was released in 2018 after multiple delays. Wayne's thirteenth album, Funeral, was released in early 2020.

Lil Wayne has sold over 120 million records worldwide, including more than 20 million albums and 70 million digital tracks in the United States, making him one of the world's best-selling music artists. He has won five Grammy Awards, 11 BET Awards, four Billboard Music Awards, two MTV Video Music Awards and eight NAACP Image Awards. On September 27, 2012, he became the first male artist to surpass Elvis Presley with the most entries on the Billboard Hot 100, with 109 songs. Lil Wayne also currently serves as the chief executive officer (CEO) of his own label, Young Money Entertainment.

Early life
Dwayne Michael Carter Jr. was born on September 27, 1982, and spent his first few years in the impoverished Hollygrove neighborhood of Uptown New Orleans, Louisiana's 17th Ward. His mother, a cook, gave birth to him when she was 19 years old. His parents divorced when he was two and his father permanently abandoned the family. When CBS interviewer Katie Couric asked why he used the name Wayne instead of his given name, Carter explained that "I dropped the D because I'm a junior and my father is living and he's not in my life and he's never been in my life. So I don't want to be Dwayne, I'd rather be Wayne". Asked if his father knew of this, Carter replied, "He knows now". Carter has said that he considers his deceased stepfather Reginald "Rabbit" McDonald to be his real father. Carter has a tattoo dedicated to McDonald.

Carter was enrolled in the gifted program at Lafayette Elementary School. He later attended Eleanor McMain Secondary School for two years, where he was an honor student and a member of the drama club, playing the Tin Man in the school's production of The Wiz. After matriculating to Marion Abramson Senior High School, Carter dropped out at age 14 to focus on his musical career.

Carter wrote his first rap song at age eight. In the summer of 1991, he met rapper and Cash Money Records co-founder Bryan "Baby" Williams (known currently as Birdman), who mentored him and encouraged his love of hip-hop; Birdman included Carter on several Cash Money tracks, and Carter would often record freestyle raps on Williams' answering machine.

In 1994, at age 12, Carter suffered a near-fatal self-inflicted gunshot wound to the chest. At the time he said the injury was accidental. Decades later Carter claimed that it was an attempted suicide after he was told by his mother that he would have to end his rap-related associations. Carter credits off-duty police officer Robert Hoobler, who he calls "Uncle Bob", with saving his life by insisting the dying child be driven immediately to hospital in a police car rather than waiting for an ambulance to become available. Other accounts indicate that several officers played a part in deciding on and implementing that course of action.

Career

1997–1999: Career beginnings and Hot Boys
In 1997, Carter joined the Hot Boys along with rappers Juvenile, B.G., and Turk. At age 14, Carter was the youngest member at the time. Hot Boys' debut album Get It How U Live! was released the same year, followed in 1999 by the group's major-label debut Guerrilla Warfare, which reached No. 1 on the Billboard Top R&B/Hip-Hop Albums chart and No. 5 on the Billboard 200. During their career, the Hot Boys had two charting singles, "We on Fire" from Get It How U Live! and "I Need a Hot Girl" from Guerrilla Warfare. Carter was also featured on Juvenile's single "Back That Azz Up", which reached No. 18 on the Billboard Hot 100 and No. 5 on the Hot R&B/Hip-Hop Singles & Tracks. Let 'Em Burn, a compilation album of unreleased tracks recorded during 1999 and 2000, came out in 2003, several years after the group disbanded. It reached No. 3 on the Top R&B/Hip-Hop Albums chart and No. 14 on the Billboard 200.

1999–2004: Tha Block Is Hot, Lights Out, and 500 Degreez
Carter's debut solo album, Tha Block Is Hot, was released when he was 17 and featured significant contributions from the Hot Boys. It debuted at number 3 on the Billboard 200 and was later certified platinum by the RIAA less than two months after its release. The album earned Carter a 1999 Source magazine nomination for "Best New Artist", and also became a Top Ten hit. The lead single was "Tha Block Is Hot". After the release of Tha Block Is Hot, Carter was featured on the single "Bling Bling", with B.G., Juvenile, and Big Tymers. Carter's verse appeared only on the radio version of the song, while on the album version he performed on the chorus.

His second album, Lights Out, was released in 2000, and failed to attain the level of success achieved by his debut but was certified gold by RIAA. Critics noted the lack of coherent narratives in his verses as evidence that he had yet to mature to the level of his fellow Hot Boys. The lead single was "Get Off the Corner", which was noticed for an improvement in its lyrical content and style. The second single, which received less attention, was "Shine" featuring the Hot Boys. Near the release of Lights Out, Carter was featured on the single, "Number One Stunna" with Big Tymers and Juvenile, which peaked at number 24 on the Hot Rap Tracks chart.

Carter's third album, 500 Degreez, was released in 2002. It followed the format of his previous two, with significant contributions from the Hot Boys and Mannie Fresh. While being certified gold like its predecessor, it also failed to match the success of his debut. The title was a reference to the recently estranged Hot Boys member Juvenile's recording, 400 Degreez. The lead single was "Way of Life" which failed to match the success of his previous singles. After the release of 500 Degreez, Carter was featured on the single "Neva Get Enuf" by 3LW.

2004–2006: Tha Carter, Tha Carter II, and Like Father, Like Son
In the summer of 2004, Carter's fourth studio album, Tha Carter, was released, marking what critics considered advancement in his rapping style and lyrical themes. In addition, the album's cover art featured the debut of Wayne's now-signature dreadlocks. Tha Carter gained Wayne significant recognition, selling 878,000 copies in the United States, while the single "Go DJ" became a Top 5 Hit on the R&B/Hip-Hop chart. After the release of Tha Carter, Lil Wayne was featured in Destiny's Child's single "Soldier" with T.I., which peaked at number 3 on the Billboard Hot 100 and the Hot R&B/Hip-Hop Songs charts.

Tha Carter II, the follow-up to the original Tha Carter album, was released in December 2005, this time without production by longtime Cash Money Records producer Mannie Fresh, who had left the label. Tha Carter II sold more than 238,000 copies in its first week of release, debuting at number 2 on the Billboard 200 albums chart, and went on to sell 2,000,000 copies worldwide. The lead single "Fireman" became a hit in the US, peaking at 32 on the Billboard Hot 100 chart. Other singles included "Grown Man" with Currensy, "Hustler Musik", and "Shooter" with R&B singer Robin Thicke. Carter also appeared on a remix of Bobby Valentino's "Tell Me", which rose to number 13 on the U.S. R&B Charts. In 2005, Carter was named president of Cash Money, and in the same year he founded Young Money Entertainment as an imprint of Cash Money. However, as of late 2007, Carter reported having stepped down from the management of both labels and had handed management of Young Money over to Cortez Bryant.

In 2006, Carter collaborated with Birdman for the album Like Father, Like Son, whose first single "Stuntin' Like My Daddy", reached number 21 on the Billboard Hot 100.

2006–2007: Mixtapes and collaborations

Instead of a follow-up solo album, Carter began to reach his audience through a plethora of mixtapes and guest appearances on a variety of pop and hip hop singles. Of his many mixtapes, Dedication 2 and Da Drought 3 received the most media exposure and critical review. Dedication 2, released in 2006, paired Carter with DJ Drama and contained the acclaimed socially conscious track "Georgia Bush", in which Carter critiqued former US president George W. Bush's response to the effects of Hurricane Katrina on the city of New Orleans. Da Drought 3 was released the following year and was available for free legal download. It contained Carter rapping over a variety of beats from recent hits by other musicians. A number of prominent hip hop magazines such as XXL and Vibe covered the mixtape. Christian Hoard of Rolling Stone magazine considered the mixtapes Da Drought 3 and The Drought Is Over 2 (The Carter 3 Sessions) "among the best albums of 2007".

Despite no album release for two years, Carter appeared in numerous singles as a featured performer, including "Gimme That" by Chris Brown, "Make It Rain" by Fat Joe, "You" by Lloyd, and "We Takin' Over" by DJ Khaled (also featuring Akon, T.I., Rick Ross, Fat Joe, and Birdman), "Duffle Bag Boy" by Playaz Circle, "Sweetest Girl (Dollar Bill)" by Wyclef Jean (also featuring Akon), and the remix to "I'm So Hood" by DJ Khaled (also featuring T-Pain, Young Jeezy, Ludacris, Busta Rhymes, Big Boi, Fat Joe, Birdman, and Rick Ross). All these singles charted within the top 20 spots on the Billboard Hot 100, Hot Rap Tracks, and Hot R&B/Hip-Hop Songs charts. On Birdman's 2007 album, 5 * Stunna, Carter appeared on the singles "100 Million" and "I Run This" among several other tracks. Carter also appeared on tracks from albums Getback by Little Brother, American Gangster by Jay-Z, and Graduation by Kanye West and Insomniac by Enrique Iglesias. "Make it Rain", a Scott Storch production that peaked at number 13 on the Hot 100 and number two on the Hot Rap Tracks chart, was nominated for the Grammy Award for Best Rap Performance by a Duo or Group for 2008.

Vibe magazine ranked a list of 77 of Lil Wayne's songs from 2007 and ranked his verse in DJ Khaled's "We Takin Over" as his best of 2007, with "Dough Is What I Got" (a freestyle over the beat of Jay-Z's "Show Me What You Got") from Da Drought 3. At the end of 2007, an MTV poll selected Lil Wayne as "Hottest MC in the Game", The New Yorker magazine ranked him "Rapper of the Year", and GQ magazine named him "Workaholic of the Year". In 2008 he was named "Best MC" by Rolling Stone. Another article, built around Lil Wayne's 2007 mixtape work, cites his creative practice as an example of post-performance creative practice.

2007–2010: Tha Carter III, We Are Young Money, and Rebirth

In 2007, Carter stated that he would reunite with Hot Boys, with plans to release an album after B.G.'s solo album Too Hood to Be Hollywood was completed. Tha Carter III was originally scheduled to be released in 2007, but it was delayed after several recordings were leaked and distributed through mixtapes, including The Drought Is Over Pt. 2 and The Drought Is Over Pt. 4. Lil Wayne initially planned to release The Leak, a separate album with leaked songs and four additional tracks, on December 18, 2007, with Tha Carter III delayed to March 18, 2008. Instead, The Leak became an EP with five songs and was released digitally on December 25, 2007.

Tha Carter III was released on June 10, 2008, with first-week sales of over 1 million copies, the first to do so since 50 Cent's The Massacre (2005). The album's first single "Lollipop", featuring Static Major, became the Carter's most successful song at the time, topping the Billboard Hot 100 and becoming his first top 10 single as a solo artist and his first number one on the chart. The third single "Got Money", featuring T-Pain, peaked at number 13 on the Billboard 100. Tha Carter III went on to win four Grammy Awards, including best rap album and best rap song, which he won for "Lollipop". On July 14, 2008, the Recording Industry Association of America certified Tha Carter III two times platinum. In October 2008, Lil Wayne announced plans to MTV News to re-release the album with new tracks, including a duet with Ludacris and remixes of "A Milli".

Carter also appeared on R&B singles "Girls Around the World" by Lloyd, "Love In This Club, Part II" by Usher, "Official Girl" by Cassie, "I'm So Paid" by Akon, "Turnin' Me On" by Keri Hilson, and "Can't Believe It" by T-Pain; rap singles "My Life" by The Game, "Shawty Say" by David Banner, "Swagga Like Us" by T.I., "Cutty Buddy" by Mike Jones, All My Life (In the Ghetto) by Jay Rock and the remix to "Certified" by Glasses Malone; and pop single "Let It Rock" by new Cash Money artist Kevin Rudolf.

In 2008, Carter performed at the Voodoo Experience in October in New Orleans, which was described by Jonathan Cohen of Billboard as his biggest hometown headlining set of his career. He also performed at the Virgin Mobile Music Fest with Kanye West, where they performed the remix of "Lollipop" and lip-synced to Whitney Houston's "I Will Always Love You". Lil Wayne also performed at the 2008 MTV Video Music Awards with Kid Rock ("All Summer Long"), Leona Lewis ("DontGetIt (Misunderstood)") and T-Pain ("Got Money") and performed "Lollipop" and "Got Money" on the season premiere of Saturday Night Live. He later performed at the homecoming rally at Vanderbilt University and the 2008 BET Hip Hop Awards, where he received 12 nominations. He won eight awards at the BET Hip Hop Awards, one of which included the "MVP" title. After M.I.A. dropped out of performing on the I Am Music Tour due to her pregnancy, Jay-Z performed "Mr. Carter" with Lil Wayne at select shows.

Following Tha Carter III achievement of selling over 3 million copies, becoming 2008's best-selling record, Carter re-signed with Cash Money Records for a multi-album deal.
On November 11, 2008, Carter became the first hip hop act to perform at the Country Music Association Awards, playing "All Summer Long" alongside Kid Rock, in which Carter inaudibly strummed guitar strings alongside the guitarist in Kid Rock's band. Shortly after, Wayne was nominated for eight Grammys – the most for any artist nominated that year. He was then named the first MTV Man of the Year at the end of 2008. He won the Grammy Award for Best Rap Solo Performance for "A Milli", Best Rap Performance by a Duo or Group for his appearance in T.I.'s single "Swagga Like Us", and Best Rap Song for "Lollipop". Tha Carter III won the award for Best Rap Album. MTV News listed Carter number two on their 2009 list of the Hottest MCs In The Game.

On January 6, 2009, Carter was a guest debater against Skip Bayless on the "1st & 10" segment of ESPN First Take. On February 10, 2009, he appeared on ESPN's Around the Horn and beat out veterans Woody Paige, Jay Mariotti and fellow New Orleanian Michael Smith to win that show's episode. Prior to the 2009 Grammy Awards, Wayne was featured in an interview with Katie Couric. On February 7, 2009, he presented the Top Ten List on CBS's Late Show with David Letterman. On April 24, 2009, he appeared on The View, discussing his GED and addictions. In September 2009, Carter was profiled in an episode of VH1's Behind the Music and was a presenter of the 2009 MTV Movie Awards. In film, Carter produced and composed music for and starred in the direct-to-video film Hurricane Season. A documentary of Carter, titled The Carter, was released at the Sundance Film Festival.

On December 23, 2009, Carter released a collaboration album with Young Money, We Are Young Money, with its lead single being "Every Girl". The second single was "BedRock", featuring Lloyd, with the third being "Roger That". On May 24, 2010, the album was certified gold by the RIAA with over 500,000 copies sold. Carter is featured on the song, "Revolver", with Madonna for her greatest hits album, Celebration (2009). He was also featured on a Weezer song, "Can't Stop Partying", on Raditude (2009). In late 2008, Carter announced plans to reissue Tha Carter III with leftover recordings, and was to be titled Rebirth, originally scheduled to be released on April 7, 2009, before being delayed several times. Rebirth instead became his sixth solo album, released on February 2, 2010.

To support its release and that of We Are Young Money, Carter was featured on the cover of Rolling Stone and headlined the 'Young Money Presents: America's Most Wanted Music Festival', a United States and Canada–only concert tour which began on July 29, 2009. "Prom Queen", the first official single, debuted on January 27, 2009, immediately after a live Internet broadcast on Ustream of his concert in San Diego. It peaked at number 15 on the Billboard Hot 100 charts. On December 3, 2009, the second single, "On Fire", produced by Cool & Dre "On Fire" peaked at number 33 on the Billboard Hot 100 charts. "Drop the World", which features Eminem, was the third single from the Rebirth.

2010–2013: I Am Not a Human Being series and Tha Carter IV

In an interview on MTV's Mixtape Monday, Carter asserted the possibility of Tha Carter IV. He later announced that it would be released in late 2009 before the holiday season. Birdman had previously stated that Tha Carter IV would be packaged with Rebirth as a double disc album. However, Carter denied this idea saying that "Tha Carter IV deserves Tha Carter IV", adding that We Are Young Money may be packaged with Rebirth. However, both albums were released separately.

Originally thought to be an EP, Carter released his tenth album, I Am Not a Human Being, on his 28th birthday, September 27, 2010. The album has sold over 953,000 copies in the U.S. and spawned successful single "Right Above It", which peaked at No. 6 on the Billboard Hot 100. Tha Carter IV was later delayed into 2011, after Lil Wayne began recording from scratch after his release from prison. He described his first song since his release as "a 2010 version of A Milli on steroids". The album's lead single, "6 Foot 7 Foot" featuring Cory Gunz, was released on December 15, 2010, and made available for digital download on iTunes on December 16, 2010. The song is produced by Bangladesh, who also produced "A Milli".

On March 8, 2011, Carter released another song, "We Back Soon", produced by StreetRunner, though it was not included on the official track listing of Tha Carter IV. The second single, "John", was released on March 24, 2011, which features Rick Ross and is produced by Polow Da Don. The album's artwork was unveiled on April 20, 2011. The album was originally scheduled to be released on May 16, 2011, but Mack Maine had confirmed its delay until June 21. On May 26, 2011, the third single, "How to Love", was released. A song called "Dear Anne (Stan Part 2)" was released in June. Carter said the song was a throwaway track from Tha Carter III and was originally supposed to be on Tha Carter IV, but decided not to put it on there because of its age. Carter said that he liked the beat, but not the lyrics, and was thinking about revamping the song.

In July 2011, Carter confirmed in an interview with MTV that Tha Carter IV was finished, and was released on August 29, 2011. For preparation for Tha Carter IV, Carter released a mixtape, Sorry 4 the Wait, with all the beats coming from other artist's songs, similar to his mixtape No Ceilings. Tha Carter IV debuted at number one on the Billboard 200, with first-week sales of 964,000 copies, making it Carter's third chart-topping album of his career. On January 8, 2012, according to Nielsen SoundScan was elected the seventh artist (second male artist) all-time best-selling tracks digital with 36,788,000 million to the end of 2011.

In October 2011, it was reported that Carter was working on sequels to both I Am Not a Human Being and Rebirth. In January 2012, Birdman announced that he and Carter had finished recording Like Father, Like Son 2. On November 22, 2012, he announced that Tha Carter V would be his final album.
After numerous delays, I Am Not a Human Being II was released on March 26, 2013, debuting at number two on the Billboard 200 selling 217,000 copies in its first week; "My Homies Still", "Love Me", and "No Worries" were released as singles prior to its release. The album was met with generally mixed reviews, with most critics noticing the declining quality of his releases. Carter toured North America with 2 Chainz and T.I. on the second America's Most Wanted Festival. On May 3, 2013, Pepsi dropped Carter, who was a spokesperson for Mountain Dew, due to offensive lyrics about civil rights icon Emmett Till. On September 1, 2013, Carter released the fifth instalment of the "Dedication" mixtape series, with Dedication 5. The mixtape featured 29 tracks, with guest appearances from The Weeknd, Chance The Rapper, Jae Millz, Birdman, T.I., Vado, Kidd Kidd, and 2 Chainz among other members of Young Money.

2014–2019: Free Weezy Album and Tha Carter V

On February 10, 2014, Drake tweeted "CARTER V". On October 18, 2013, Cash Money Records Vice President of Promotion Mel Smith, tweeted: "Happy Friday!! New YMCMB music coming soon!! Carter 5." Nearly four months later, in an interview with The Griffin, released on February 14, 2014, Smith spoke on the upcoming album: "We're very close to dropping the album. It's going to be a huge surprise to everyone, it's an incredible album ... I can't release the date because he wants to surprise people, he wants his true fan base to get excited, but he's worked extremely hard on it and you won't be disappointed." On February 15, 2014, during the NBA All-Star Weekend festivities at Sprite's NBA All-Star concert at the House of Blues in New Orleans, Carter appeared as a special guest during Drake's set and performed various hits. Carter and Drake then announced that Tha Carter V would be released on May 5, 2014. However, on March 27, 2014, Carter's manager Cortez Bryant announced that the album had been delayed. Carter then serviced Tha Carter Vs first single "Believe Me", which features vocals from Drake, to mainstream urban radio in the United States on May 6, 2014. Three more singles, "Krazy", "Grindin'" (featuring Drake) and "Start a Fire" (featuring Christina Milian), were also released for the album.

On December 4, 2014, just five days before the album was due to be released again, Carter issued a statement saying the album would not be released on its expected release date, due to his displeasure with Cash Money Records label-boss Birdman, refusing to release the album although it had been completed. Carter also expressed his feelings by stating he felt both he and his creativity were being held "prisoner".

On January 20, 2015, Carter self-released Sorry 4 the Wait 2, a sequel to his 2011 mixtape, to compensate for the continued delay of Tha Carter V. Upon Sorry for the Wait 2s release, it was said Wayne disses Birdman and Cash Money Records, several times throughout the mixtape. Birdman was reported to be upset with this. In late January 2015, Carter sued Birdman and Cash Money Records for $51 million. In February 2015, due to Tha Carter Vs delay, Carter announced that a free album would be released prior to the fifth installment in his popular series. In June 2015, Carter joined Jay-Z's TIDAL, as an artist owner, kicking off the partnership by exclusively releasing a single on the service titled "Glory". He's also announced plans on his own TIDAL X concert series. On July 4, 2015, Carter released Free Weezy Album, exclusively through TIDAL, under Young Money and Republic Records.

Carter and Birdman supposedly reconciled after being seen at Drake's NYE Party, at Miami's Club Liv, and in studio. On January 27, 2016, when rapper 2 Chainz released his "Felt Like Cappin" EP, Carter is featured on the lead single titled "Back On That Bullshit". On March 4, 2016, 2 Chainz released his third studio album, ColleGrove. The album was initially a collaborative effort between 2 Chainz and Carter, but due to his record label issues, only 2 Chainz was credited as the primary artist. In 2017, Carter announced that he signed with Roc Nation. Later, Carter revealed that there was no official paperwork that he signed to the label. On June 28, 2016, Carter was one of the main singers in the song "Sucker for Pain", along with Wiz Khalifa and Imagine Dragons, for the DC Comics film Suicide Squad. X Ambassadors and Ty Dolla Sign were also featured in the song. On August 8, 2017, he released the song "Like a Man" with sound engineer Onhel.
On June 7, 2018, it was announced that Carter had been released from Cash Money Records and will be releasing Tha Carter V via Universal Records.

In September 2016, Carter's song "No Mercy" debuted as the theme song for Skip and Shannon: Undisputed sports talk on FS1. Carter is a frequent guest on the program. On Christmas 2017, Carter released the mixtape Dedication 6, the sixth instalment of the "Gangsta Grillz" chronology. The second part was released on January 26, 2018.

Tha Carter V was finally released on September 27, 2018, debuting at number one on the US Billboard 200 with 480,000 album-equivalent units, including 140,000 pure album sales. It is the second-largest streaming week for an album behind Drake's Scorpion with 433 million streams. It is also Carter's fourth US number-one album. Every song on the album charted on the Billboard 100, while simultaneously charting 4 songs in the top 10, also becoming the first artist to debut two songs in the top 5.

2020–present: Funeral, Young Money Radio, re-releases, I Am Not a Human Being III, Trust Fund Babies and Tha Carter VI
While Carter was working on Tha Carter V, it was announced that his next album would be titled Funeral. On January 23, 2020, he revealed the album's release date and album artwork. Funeral was released on January 31, and debuted at number-one on the US Billboard 200, with 139,000 album-equivalent units, becoming his fifth US number-one album. The album received generally positive reviews from music critics. On February 2, 2020, Lil Wayne competed in Season 3 of The Masked Singer after the Super Bowl LIV as "Robot". He was the first to be eliminated. Carter featured on Lil Baby's track "Forever", a track from Baby's second studio album, My Turn, which was released on February 28, 2020. Carter also participates in the music video for the song, which was released on March 3, 2020. This marked the second collaboration for the two artists in 2020, with the first being on Carter's single "I Do It".

On April 24, 2020, Lil Wayne along with Dash Radio, launched his own radio show, Young Money Radio, on Apple Music. Wayne described the show as having "heavyweights calling in discussing sports, music, comedy, everything!". On July 3, Lil Wayne released his eleventh studio album, Free Weezy Album (2015) on streaming services to commemorate its five-year anniversary. The album charted at number 77 on the Billboard 200 the following week. On May 29, Wayne released the deluxe edition of Funeral featuring artists such as Doja Cat, Tory Lanez, Lil Uzi Vert, Benny The Butcher, Conway the Machine and Jessie Reyez. On August 28, Wayne released another old project, his 2009 mixtape No Ceilings, for commercial release. He also celebrated the release by collaborating with ASAP Ferg on the song "No Ceilings". Wayne was featured on YoungBoy Never Broke Again's album Top on the track "My Window", released on September 11. His verse received praise from critics. On September 25, he released the deluxe edition of his twelfth album Tha Carter V, to celebrate the album's two-year anniversary; it consists of songs that did not make the cut on the original album.

On November 27, 2020, Lil Wayne released the mixtape No Ceilings 3, while announcing the album I Am Not a Human Being III for 2021, although it would not be released that year due to delays. On October 1, 2021, Wayne and Rich the Kid released a collaborative mixtape titled Trust Fund Babies, along with a music video for the single "Feelin' Like Tunechi". The mixtape took roughly a month and a half to record. On their working relationship, Wayne said, "For me, it's the chemistry, it's the camaraderie because first of all, Rich like my little bro and me and Rich been rockin' for a minute".

Wayne is currently working on Tha Carter VI.

Future projects

Carter has announced several possible upcoming projects, including a collaborative album entitled I Can't Feel My Face with Harlem-based rapper Juelz Santana, that has been in production for several years. In late 2011, it was announced by Mack Maine that Carter and Juelz Santana had gone back to work on their collaborative album I Can't Feel My Face, which had been delayed for a few years due to "label politics".

On June 19, 2008, Carter and T-Pain formed a duo called T-Wayne with plans to release an album, titled He Raps, He Sings; however, those plans have died down due to much of the material recorded for the album being leaked. T-Pain ultimately released T-Wayne in 2017.

According to an interview with Drake, in the December 2011 issue of XXL, plans for an upcoming album with Carter had been scrapped for the time being because of the Jay-Z and Kanye West collaboration album Watch the Throne (2011).

In April 2012, on the premiere of MTV's Hip Hop POV, Carter sat down with Amanda Seales and spoke briefly about an album he put together titled Devol (loved, backwards), an album full of "love songs" that he wrote during his imprisonment at Rikers Island. In May 2013 he confirmed the album will still be released.

Carter's once ongoing litigation with Cash Money prevented numerous completed projects from being released. In January 2017, Young Money revealed the title of a planned Carter album called Velvet. The album ended up leaking online in November 2018.

Retirement plans
On March 29, 2011, in an interview with Hot 97's Angie Martinez, Carter announced that he would retire at age 35; saying "I have four kids", and that "I would feel selfish still going to the studio when it's such a vital point in their lives." He said in November 2012 that Tha Carter V will be his last album as he wanted to go into other interests.

In March 2014, Carter reconfirmed at SXSW that Tha Carter V will be his last album during his keynote with interviewer Elliot Wilson.

In September 2016, in regards to his contract dispute with Cash Money, he indicated a possible retirement on Twitter saying "I AM NOW DEFENSELESS and mentally DEFEATED" and then said, "I leave gracefully and thankful I luh my fanz but I'm done." Many rappers responded with respect and encouragement.

Personal life

Relationships and children
Carter has four children. His first child, daughter Reginae, was born November 29, 1998, when he was 16, to his high school sweetheart Toya Johnson. They later married on Valentine's Day 2004 and divorced in 2006. Internet rumors started circulating in August 2008 that Carter's daughter had died in a car crash, which however he quickly cleared up as false saying "Please allow me to dispel any rumors or speculations and report that my daughter is alive, healthy and surrounded by family who cares and loves her dearly. The rumors are completely false and unfounded; neither Reginae nor any other member of my family has been involved in any car accident."

His second child, Dwayne III, was born on October 22, 2008, at The Christ Hospital in Cincinnati to radio broadcaster Sarah Vivan. His third child, Cameron, was born to actress Lauren London on September 9, 2009. His fourth child, Neal, was born on November 30, 2009, to singer Nivea. Trina also became pregnant with Carter's child, but later suffered a miscarriage.

In July 2014, it was rumored that Carter was dating singer Christina Milian whom he attended the ESPY Awards with. They later confirmed their relationship in mid-2015 after which they received criticism from their interconnected exes, singer Nivea and songwriter The-Dream. They split at the end of 2015 after collaborating on various singles, videos, and concert dates.

Wayne was engaged to model La'Tecia Thomas, but called off the engagement in May 2020.

In June 2020, it was announced that Wayne had started dating Denise Bidot, another model. In November 2020, they reportedly broke up over Wayne's endorsement of Donald Trump. Shortly after, it was reported that the couple had reconciled.

Beliefs and interests
In an interview with Blender, Carter revealed one of his favorite bands from childhood to be rock group Nirvana, and cites them as a major influence in his music.

Carter got his first tattoo at age 14 of his dad's name and his second was "Cash Money" across his stomach. His tattoos have grown to include a Jay-Z verse on his leg, "I Am Music" on his forehead and teardrops on his cheeks among many others. His most recent one is "Baked" on his forehead stylized as the Baker Skateboards logo. 

Carter identifies as a Catholic. While playing in Newark Symphony Hall, Carter professed his belief "in God and His son, Jesus". During his 2011 tour in Australia with Eminem, before beginning his bracket he proclaimed his belief in God.

After earning his GED, Carter enrolled at the University of Houston in January 2005. He dropped out in the same year due to his conflicting schedule. He also revealed on The View that he switched to the University of Phoenix and majored in psychology taking online courses. An article in Urb magazine in March 2007 asserted that Carter had been earning high grades at Houston.

On September 24, 2008, Carter published his first blog for ESPN in their issue, ESPN The Magazine. Carter revealed he was a fan of tennis, the Green Bay Packers, the Boston Bruins, the Los Angeles Lakers and the Boston Red Sox. To commemorate the Packers' making it to Super Bowl XLV, he spoofed Wiz Khalifa's hit song "Black and Yellow" (which were the colors of the Packers' opponents, the Pittsburgh Steelers) in a song titled "Green and Yellow". He released a second version of the song in 2021, which was requested by the Packers, and updated with the current roster. Carter has continued writing for ESPN, notably reporting at the ESPN Super Bowl party. Carter made his debut on ESPN's daily sports round table show Around The Horn on February 10, 2009. Carter now currently sings the intro song "No Mercy" for the Fox Sports 1 sports debate show Undisputed.

Carter received criticism after a video released by TMZ showed him apparently stepping on the U.S. flag. Carter later explained that "It was never my intention to desecrate the flag of the United States", and that he was shooting a video for a song on his upcoming album, "God Bless Amerika". He says the purpose of the flag was to show that "behind the American Flag was the Hoods of America".

In late 2016, Carter made statements critical of the Black Lives Matter movement, saying, "I don't feel connected to a damn thing that ain't got nothin' to do with me. If you do, you crazy as shit," adding that his status as a wealthy black man who has white fans is evidence that black people are valued in the United States.

In 2016, Carter purchased Player's Rep. Sports Agency, and became Young Money APAA sports, which hired NFL's first female sports agent, Nicole Lynn. She currently represents Seth Roberts, Corey Nelson, Jordan Evans, Malik Jefferson, Erik Harris, Quinnen Williams, as well as NCAA coaches, and two former #1 Pro Softball draft picks.

On October 29, 2020, less than a week before the presidential election, Carter posted an image of him and President Donald Trump to Twitter. In the caption for the photo, Carter revealed that he and Trump had recently met to discuss criminal justice reform and Trump's Platinum Plan, an initiative which aims to raise access to capital in Black communities by almost $500 billion. Carter claimed Trump "listened to what we had to say today and assured he will and can get it done".

Health problems
On October 25, 2012, Carter's private jet, bound for Los Angeles, made an emergency landing in Texas due to an in-flight medical episode. Lil Wayne was transferred to a local hospital upon arrival. TMZ and other media sources said that Carter had suffered a seizure aboard the plane. His publicist denied this, saying that he was in fact treated for "a severe migraine and dehydration".

The following day, while flying from Texas to Los Angeles, Carter's private jet was reportedly again forced to make an emergency landing, this time in Louisiana, after he suffered a second seizure and required further hospitalization. His representative said that the reports of Carter's condition had been exaggerated, and that he was resting at his Louisiana home. In a November 2012 interview with MTV, Carter revealed that he was taking seizure medication, on doctors' orders, due to the aforementioned incidents.

On March 14, 2013, TMZ reported that Carter had been treated at Cedars-Sinai Medical Center in Los Angeles on the evening of March 12, after having seizures while on a music video set with Young Money rapper Nicki Minaj. He was reportedly released in the early hours of March 13. On March 15, TMZ published a second story, claiming that hours after his release on March 13, Carter was found unconscious after experiencing further seizures, and was brought back to Cedars-Sinai, where he was admitted to the intensive care unit in critical condition. The article alleged the latest seizures were found to be linked to high amounts of codeine in Carter's system, possibly due to binging on purple drank after his initial hospital release. Multiple celebrities, including Drake and Birdman, were photographed on March 15 and 16 visiting Carter at Cedars-Sinai.

Several members of Young Money Entertainment, including president Mack Maine, criticized media reports on Carter's hospitalization, particularly those of TMZ, alleging that they exaggerated the severity of his condition and falsely implied that he was on his deathbed (such as by saying that he was in a medically induced coma), triggering what the Washington Post called "the most overheated celebrity deathwatch in recent years". In separate interviews on March 18, Mack Maine and Birdman disputed TMZ's reports, and stated that in fact there were not multiple seizures or multiple hospital visits. They explained that after Carter began seizing on the way to the music video shoot on March 12, an ambulance was called and he was transported to the hospital, where he was admitted and remained continuously thereafter. They also refuted the claims that Carter's seizures are drug-induced, saying that they are an ongoing problem for which doctors have been unable to identify a cause.

Carter was released from the hospital late on March 18, following a six-day stay. Lil Wayne addressed his condition via a vlog, on March 21 saying he was more than good.

Carter had two seizures in June 2016, during a cross-country flight from Wisconsin to California, and landed in Omaha, Nebraska. His plane was only two minutes in the air when the second seizure occurred, forcing the plane to land in Omaha once again. Less than a month later, he had another seizure, supposedly due to not taking his epilepsy medication.

Carter canceled a Las Vegas show on September 3, 2017, having had a seizure in a Chicago hospital earlier that day, where he was brought after being found unconscious in a hotel room.

Philanthropy
On February 19, 2008, Carter and Cortez Bryant revisited their alma mater McMain Secondary School to get students to design an invitation to the gala introducing Carter's nonprofit One Family Foundation.

Other ventures

Young Money Entertainment

Books
Carter wrote a memoir of his experience in Rikers Island called Gone Til' November: A Journal of Rikers Island that was released October 11, 2016.

Cannabis industry
In December 2019, Carter announced his own cannabis brand under the name of GKUA Ultra Premium.

Legal issues

Arrests and incarceration
On July 22, 2007, Carter was arrested in New York City following a performance at the Beacon Theatre; the New York City Police Department discovered Carter and another man smoking marijuana near a tour bus. After taking Carter into custody, police discovered a .40 caliber pistol near his person. The gun, which was registered to his manager, was in a bag located near the rapper. He was charged with criminal possession of a weapon and marijuana.

Following a performance at Qwest Arena in Boise, Idaho, Carter was arrested October 5, 2007 on felony fugitive charges after Georgia authorities accused the rapper of possessing a controlled substance. The incident was later described as a "mix-up" and the fugitive charges were dropped.

On January 23, 2008, Carter was arrested alongside two others. His tour bus was stopped by Border Patrol agents near Yuma, Arizona. A K-9 Unit recovered  of marijuana, almost  of cocaine,  of ecstasy, and $22,000 in cash. Carter was charged with four felonies: possession of narcotic drug for sale, possession of dangerous drugs, misconduct involving weapons and possession of drug paraphernalia. He was granted permission to travel outside of the state and remain out of custody on the $10,185 bond he posted.

On May 6, 2008, Carter returned to court in Arizona to plead not guilty to the charges. A bench warrant was issued on March 17, 2010, when Carter did not show for a final trial management conference. However, he was already incarcerated, serving a one-year sentence in Rikers Island on weapons charges. On June 22, 2010, Carter pleaded guilty to the charges. As part of the plea deal he was able to serve 36 months of probation, which he was sentenced to on June 30, 2010.

On December 18, 2009, Carter and 11 others were detained at the Falfurrias, Texas border patrol checkpoint after an unknown amount of marijuana was found on two of his tour buses.

On October 22, 2009, Carter pleaded guilty to attempted criminal possession of a weapon. He was due for sentencing in February 2010 and was expected to receive a one-year county jail sentence, but on February 9, 2010, Carter's attorney announced that the sentencing was delayed until March 2 due to dental surgery, which was performed on February 16. The surgery included eight root canals, the replacement of several tooth implants, as well as the addition of a few new implants and work on his remaining original teeth. On March 2, 2010, sentencing was postponed again when the courthouse reported a fire in the basement.

On March 8, 2010, Carter was given a one-year sentence, which he served in Rikers Island. His lawyer said the rapper expected to be held in protective custody, separated from other prisoners. In May 2010, Carter was found by Rikers Island correctional staff to be in possession of contraband (an MP3 player, charger, and headphones). In April 2010, Carter's friends created a website called Weezy Thanx You, which publishes letters written by Carter while incarcerated. In the first letter, titled "Gone 'til November", Carter said he was staying in good spirits thinking about his children and spending his time working out regularly and reading the Bible every day. Carter was released from Rikers Island Jail on November 4, 2010, after serving eight months of his year-long sentence.

On December 12, 2020, Carter pleaded guilty to a federal firearms charge brought against him by the U.S. Attorney for the Southern District of Florida. This plea stemmed from an incident during December of the previous year, when Carter was arrested in Florida after transporting a loaded handgun on his private jet from California. As a convicted felon, he is barred from possessing such weapons. He was pardoned by U.S. President Donald Trump on January 19, 2021, his last full day in office.

Lawsuits
On July 24, 2008, Abkco Music Inc filed a lawsuit against Carter for copyright infringement and unfair competition, specifically referring to Tha Carter III track "Playing with Fire". In the lawsuit, Abkco says that the song was obviously derived from The Rolling Stones' "Play with Fire", to which Abkco owns the rights. Subsequently, "Playing with Fire" was removed from the track list of Tha Carter III on all online music stores and replaced with the David Banner produced track, "Pussy Monster".

In February 2009, production company RMF Productions filed a $1.3 million lawsuit against Carter following a $100,000 advance payment for three shows, all of which were cancelled by the artist.

In October 2009, Carter, Birdman, Cash Money Records, and various music distribution outlets were sued for copyright infringement by Thomas Marasciullo, who says his voice was used without permission. The rappers asked him to record some "Italian-styled spoken word recordings" in 2006. The lyrics were allegedly used on "Respect" and other tracks from the rappers' collaboration album Like Father, Like Son and Birdman's 5 * Stunna.

In March 2011, producer Deezle (Darius Harrison) sued Carter and his parent labels Cash Money Records over unpaid royalties from Tha Carter III.

In May 2011, producer Bangladesh also filed a lawsuit against Weezy & Co. over unpaid royalties as well.

In early June 2011, another producer named David Kirkwood filed a lawsuit against Young Money Entertainment and Cash Money Records on claims that the labels have failed to pay him over $1.5 million in royalties and production services for his work on the album, also including his songwriting on "Love Me or Hate Me", a bonus song featured only on the deluxe edition of the album.

Also in June 2011, Dallas producers Play-N-Skillz filed a lawsuit against him, saying Carter owes them at least $1 million in unpaid royalties for "Got Money" from his album Tha Carter III. The single has sold over 2 million copies since being released.

In July 2011, Done Deal Enterprises, a production company based in Georgia, filed suit against Carter, Universal Music Group, Cash Money Records and Young Money Entertainment, claiming copyright infringement. The lawsuit alleges Carter stole the song "BedRock", featured on the compilation album We Are Young Money, and seeks damages of $15 million.

In November 2012, Wayne was ordered to pay Quincy Jones III $2.2 million based on a lawsuit which stated that the rapper blocked the release of Jones’s film The Carter, therefore infringing on its profits.

Feuds

Juvenile 
Carter began feuding with former Hot Boys member and Cash Money Records labelmate Juvenile in 2002, after Juvenile took offense to Carter naming his third studio album 500 Degreez, a diss aimed towards Juvenile whose last album was named 400 Degreez. Juvenile responded with a diss track on his 2002 album 600 Degreez, titled "A Hoe". In the song, Juvenile questions Carter's sexuality, and says he's a fake gangster. The two squashed their beef for a short period in 2004, with Carter and Birdman appearing in the music video for Juvenile and Soulja Slim's song, Slow Motion. Carter later paid tribute to the Hot Boys with a song called "I Miss My Dawgs" on 2004's Tha Carter. Juvenile responded by calling the song "fake", and criticized Carter for releasing a tribute song and later promoting the album on BET and having "nothing good to say about them". The two eventually reconciled once again, and Juvenile re-signed with Cash Money Records in 2014.

Young Buck 
Young Buck released a song called "Off Parole", featuring Tony Yayo, which insulted Carter. Young Buck said that Carter could not be angry, because Young Buck spoke the truth. Young Buck also said "You think you got a problem with Juve and B.G.; you'll have a true problem with me", referring to the Cash Money-Juvenile/B.G feud. One of the reasons 50 Cent stated he was dismissing Young Buck was what he called "inconsistent behavior" which included appearing on stage with Carter, then seemingly dissing him on records with G-Unit. After he was dismissed, Young Buck appeared in the music video "My Life" by The Game, which featured Carter in the vocals. As of 2009, Young Buck and Carter have squashed their beef and also linked up to record a track "Up's and Down's" for Young Buck's Back On My Buck Shit mixtape.

Pusha T 
Tension between Wayne and American rapper, Pusha T, had been going on for years, beginning soon after Clipse and Birdman worked on "What Happened to That Boy", the latter's 2002 single. In 2006, Wayne felt the Clipse song "Mr. Me Too" was directed at him which caused more tension between the two. In 2012 after much speculation that Pusha T was subliminally dissing Canadian rapper and Wayne's Young Money signee Drake in several songs, the speculation heightened after the release of Pusha T's "Exodus 23:1" song. Lil Wayne quickly responded on online social networking service Twitter and later released a diss track titled "Goulish". In the first verse Wayne raps "Fuck Pusha T and anybody that love him / His head up his ass, I'mma have to head-butt him". Pusha T called Wayne's diss track "horrible" and said he felt it did not deserve a response. Both men have downplayed the feud, with Wayne saying he's over it. However, in November 2012, Pusha T dissed Wayne and Birdman on a new Ludacris song titled "Tell Me What They Mad For". However, once the feud between Lil Wayne and Birdman arose, Pusha T sent out a tweet encouraging Lil Wayne to sign to G.O.O.D. Music, which also insulted Birdman for his hand-rubbing habit.

Jay-Z 
In a 2009 interview with Tropical TV, Birdman disputed the MTV poll that voted Jay-Z "The Hottest MC in the Game", stating that Lil Wayne was a better rapper and made more money. In early 2011, when Jay-Z and Kanye West's single "H•A•M" was released, Jay-Z took shots at Birdman, saying "Really, you got Baby money" and "[you] ain't got my lady's money!". On August 24, 2011, a song called "It's Good" by Lil Wayne (featuring Drake and Jadakiss) was leaked online and included Lil Wayne responding "Talkin' 'bout baby money? I gotcha baby money. Kidnap your bitch, get that, How much you love your lady? money". Jadakiss later absolved himself of involvement in any brewing beef on his official Twitter feed.

Discography

Studio albums
Tha Block Is Hot (1999)
Lights Out (2000)
500 Degreez (2002)
Tha Carter (2004)
Tha Carter II (2005)
Tha Carter III (2008)
Rebirth (2010)
I Am Not a Human Being (2010)
Tha Carter IV (2011)
I Am Not a Human Being II (2013)
Free Weezy Album (2015)
Tha Carter V (2018)
Funeral (2020)
Tha Carter VI (TBA)
I Am Not a Human Being III (TBA)

Filmography

Film

Television

Awards and nominations

See also 
 List of artists who reached number one in the United States
 List of best-selling music artists in the United States
 List of best-selling singles in the United States
 List of best-selling singles worldwide
 List of best-selling albums by year in the United States
 List of artists who reached number one on the UK Singles Chart

References

External links

Lil Wayne on Spotify

 
1982 births
Living people
20th-century American rappers
21st-century American male actors
21st-century American rappers
African-American business executives
African-American businesspeople
African-American male actors
African-American male rappers
African-American record producers
American businesspeople convicted of crimes
American chief executives
American hip hop record producers
American hip hop singers
American male television actors
American music industry executives
American people convicted of drug offenses
American shooting survivors
Bloods
Businesspeople from New Orleans
Cash Money Millionaires members
Cash Money Records artists
Hardcore hip hop artists
Grammy Award winners for rap music
Hot Boys members
Male actors from New Orleans
People with epilepsy
Pop rappers
Record producers from Louisiana
Rappers from New Orleans
Recipients of American presidential pardons
Republic Records artists
Singer-songwriters from Louisiana
Southern hip hop musicians
Universal Motown Records artists
Universal Records artists
University of Phoenix alumni
World Music Awards winners
Young Money Entertainment artists
African-American Catholics
African-American skateboarders